Miloš Manojlović (born 25 October 1997) is a Serbian football forward who plays for Bačka 1901.

Career

Spartak Subotica
Manojlović was a member of OFK Beograd and Radnički Šid youth selections, before he joined Spartak Subotica. He signed a three-year scholarship contract with Spartak as a cadet in 2013. In 2015, he joined the first team and made his Serbian SuperLiga in 5th fixture of 2015–16 season, when he was substituted in from the bench. Manojlović was nominated for the best youth player of FK Spartak in 2015.

Career statistics

References

External links
 
 Miloš Manojlović stats at utakmica.rs 
 

1997 births
Living people
People from Šid
Association football forwards
Serbian footballers
FK Spartak Subotica players
FK Senta players
FK Proleter Novi Sad players
FK Radnički Šid players
FK Bačka 1901 players
Serbian SuperLiga players
Serbian First League players